La Passione is a 2010 Italian comedy film directed by Carlo Mazzacurati. The film was nominated for the Golden Lion at the 67th Venice International Film Festival.

Plot
In a small village in Umbria, the film director Gianni is in deep creative crisis. He lives like a bum, no longer an idea to create a movie when its problems if there is another bigger than all the others. His home water pipe broke, flooding as a precious fresco of the church in the country. Gianni has two choices: pay the damage or finance and direct a sacred representation of the Passion of Christ. Since we do not have the money to pay for the damage to the fresco ancient, Gianni agrees to regain the Italian public by directing the sacred representation.

Cast
 Kasia Smutniak
 Stefania Sandrelli
 Cristiana Capotondi
 Silvio Orlando as Gianni Dubois
 Giuseppe Battiston
 Corrado Guzzanti
 Marco Messeri

References

External links

2010 films
2010 comedy films
Italian comedy films
2010s Italian-language films
Films directed by Carlo Mazzacurati
2010s Italian films
Fandango (Italian company) films